Ernst Haeussermann (3 June 1916 – 11 June 1984) was a German-born Austrian theatre director and actor. Haeussermann was the son of the actor Reinhold Häussermann. Because of his Jewish origins, he was forced to flee Austria after the Anschluss of 1938. He settled in the United States, and appeared in small roles in several Hollywood productions. He returned to Austria after the war, and he worked in the country's most prominent theatres. He was married twice: first to Johanna Lothar, a fellow émigré he met in America and later to the actress Susi Nicoletti.

Filmography

References

Bibliography
 Weniger, Kay. 'Es wird im Leben dir mehr genommen als gegeben ...' Lexikon der aus Deutschland und Österreich emigrierten Filmschaffenden 1933 bis 1945. ACABUS Verlag, 2011.

External links

1916 births
1984 deaths
Actors from Leipzig
People from the Kingdom of Saxony
German male stage actors
German male film actors
German theatre directors
Jewish emigrants from Austria to the United States after the Anschluss
Austrian male stage actors
Austrian male film actors
Austrian theatre directors
Jewish male actors
20th-century German male actors
20th-century Austrian male actors
Burials at Döbling Cemetery